This is a list of films which have placed number one at the weekend box office in Chile during 2009.

Films

See also
 List of Chilean films

External links
 Chilean Box Office Weekly

2009
Chile
2009 in Chile